In algebraic number theory, Leopoldt's conjecture, introduced by  , states that the p-adic regulator of a number field does not vanish. The p-adic regulator is an analogue of the usual 

Leopoldt proposed a definition of a p-adic regulator Rp attached to K and a prime number p. The definition of Rp uses an appropriate determinant with entries the p-adic logarithm of a generating set of units of K (up to torsion), in the manner of the usual regulator. The conjecture, which for general K is still open , then comes out as the statement that Rp is not zero.

Formulation

Let K be a number field and for each prime P of K above some fixed rational prime p, let UP denote the local units at P and let U1,P denote the subgroup of principal units in UP. Set

 

Then let E1 denote the set of global units ε that map to U1 via the diagonal embedding of the global units in E.

 expressed the residue of the p-adic Dedekind zeta function of a totally real field at s = 1 in terms of the p-adic regulator. As a consequence, Leopoldt's conjecture for those fields is equivalent to their p-adic Dedekind zeta functions having a simple pole at s = 1.

References

.

.

Algebraic number theory
Conjectures
Unsolved problems in number theory